Highways in Western Australia include both roads that are named as a highway, and roads that have been declared as a highway under the Main Roads Act 1930. The standard of highways range from two-lane roads, common in rural areas, to controlled access, grade separated freeways in Perth.

In legislation, a highway is a type of road controlled and maintained by the state road authority, Main Roads Western Australia. Any road or section of road may be proclaimed a highway by the Governor of Western Australia, on the recommendation of the Commissioner of Main Roads, under Section 13 of the Main Roads Act 1930. Section 14 of the act allows for the creation of new highways. Main Roads assigns each highway a name and number, which may vary from the official road names used on road signs and by the general public. The highway number does not correspond to a road route that may be allocated to the highway, and some highways are not part of a numbered route.

Proclaimed highways

Main roads with highway names
A "main road" is another type of road controlled by Main Roads Western Australia.

Outback tracks with highway names
As the outback covers most of Western Australia, tracks provide vital links to remote communities and settlements. These tracks are unsealed, remote, and in many cases pass through restricted areas such as Aboriginal lands and Indigenous Protected Areas, which require transit permits.

Anne Beadell Highway
Connie Sue Highway
Eagle Highway
Gary Highway
Gunbarrel Highway
Heather Highway
Buntine Highway

Road routes with highway names

Highway 1 is a route that circumnavigates Australia, joining all mainland state capitals, via roads numbered 1, M1, A1, or B1, as some states use an alphanumeric route numbering system. In Western Australia, most of the highway is designated as National Route 1. However, the sections in the north-east and south-east of the state that are concurrent with the National Highway routes from Perth to Adelaide and from Perth to Darwin are designated as National Highway 1.

See also

 Highways in Australia for highways in other states and territories
 List of highways in Australia for roads named as highways, but not necessarily classified as highways
 List of roadhouses in Western Australia
 List of road routes in Western Australia

Notes

References

 
Lists of roads in Western Australia